Ikot Nte is a village in Etinan local government area of Akwa Ibom State, Nigeria.

References 

Villages in Akwa Ibom